Jeffrey Joseph Bleday (born November 10, 1997) is an American professional baseball outfielder for the Oakland Athletics of Major League Baseball (MLB). He made his MLB debut in 2022 with the Miami Marlins.

Amateur career
Bleday grew up in Titusville, Pennsylvania, and attended Titusville Area High School as a freshman and sophomore before transferring to A. Crawford Mosley High School in Lynn Haven, Florida for his junior and senior years. As a junior, he batted .373 while pitching to a 4–1 record and 2.43 earned run average. After his senior year, Bleday was drafted by the San Diego Padres in the 39th round of the 2016 Major League Baseball draft. However, he did not sign and instead chose to attend Vanderbilt University to play college baseball for the Vanderbilt Commodores.

In 2017, as a freshman at Vanderbilt, Bleday appeared in 51 games in which he hit .256 with two home runs and 22 runs batted in (RBIs). That summer, he played for the Newport Gulls of the New England Collegiate Baseball League where he batted .232 with two home runs over 69 at-bats. As a sophomore in 2018, Bleday missed 22 games due to an oblique injury but still appeared in 39 games for the Commodores, batting .368 with four home runs and 15 RBIs. Following the collegiate season, he played in the Cape Cod Baseball League and was named a league all-star and the top professional prospect after hitting .311 with five home runs and 15 RBIs in during 36 games for the Orleans Firebirds. In 2019, Bleday's junior year, he was named the Southeastern Conference Baseball Player of the Year. He finished the season slashing .347/.465/.701 with 27 home runs and 72 RBIs during 71 games, helping Vanderbilt win the 2019 NCAA Division I baseball tournament.

Professional career

Miami Marlins
Bleday was considered one of the top prospects for the 2019 Major League Baseball draft. He was selected by the Miami Marlins with the fourth overall pick and signed for $6.7 million. He made his professional debut on July 20, 2019, with the Class A-Advanced Jupiter Hammerheads of the Florida State League and spent the whole season there. Over 38 games, Bleday slashed .257/.311/.379 with three home runs and 19 RBIs.

Bleday did not play a minor league game in 2020 due to the cancellation of the minor league season caused by the COVID-19 pandemic. For the 2021 season, he was assigned to the Pensacola Blue Wahoos of the Double-A South. Over 110 games, he slashed .212/.323/.373 with 12 home runs, 54 RBIs, 22 doubles, and 101 strikeouts. He walked 64 times during the season which was second in the league. He was selected to play in the Arizona Fall League (AFL) for the Mesa Solar Sox after the season where he was named to the Fall Stars Game and was named the game's MVP. Bleday ended the AFL with a .316/.435/.600 slash line over 25 games and was named the league's Hitter of the Year alongside Juan Yepez. Prior to the 2022 season, Bleday gained  of muscle. He was assigned to the Jacksonville Jumbo Shrimp of the Triple-A International League to begin the year. 

On July 23, 2022, the Marlins selected Bleday's contract and promoted him to the major leagues. He made his major league debut as a pinch-hitter that night at PNC Park versus the Pittsburgh Pirates, drawing a walk in his only plate appearance of the night. He recorded his first major league hit the next night with an infield single off of Mitch Keller.

Oakland Athletics
On February 11, 2023, the Marlins traded Bleday to the Oakland Athletics in exchange for A. J. Puk. Bleday was optioned to the Triple-A Las Vegas Aviators to begin the 2023 season.

References

External links

Vanderbilt Commodores bio

1997 births
Living people
People from Danville, Pennsylvania
Baseball players from Pennsylvania
All-American college baseball players
Major League Baseball outfielders
Miami Marlins players
Vanderbilt Commodores baseball players
Orleans Firebirds players
Jupiter Hammerheads players
Pensacola Blue Wahoos players
Mesa Solar Sox players
Jacksonville Jumbo Shrimp players